Kevin Patrick Walter (born August 4, 1981) is a former American football wide receiver. He was drafted by the New York Giants in the seventh round of the 2003 NFL Draft. He played college football at Eastern Michigan.

Walter also played for the Cincinnati Bengals and Houston Texans.

Early years
Walter grew up in Vernon Hills, Illinois  where he attended Hawthorn Middle School South, and played wide receiver for Libertyville High School in neighboring Libertyville, Illinois, a suburb 30 minutes north of Chicago. He lettered three times in football, earning first-team all-state honors as a wide receiver after catching 48 passes for 801 yards and 6 touchdowns. He helped the team to a 10-1 record and a berth in the second round of the state tournament. Walter also was selected first-team all-area, all-conference and All-Lake County. He caught 17 passes for 201 yards and two touchdowns as a junior.

College career
Walter attended Eastern Michigan University, where he set school records for receptions (211), receiving yards (2,838), and touchdown catches (20). He also earned first-team All-MAC honors as a senior with 93 receptions for 1,368 receiving yards, which were both school single-season records.

Professional career

New York Giants
Walter was a late seventh-round pick (255 overall) in the 2003 NFL Draft by the New York Giants out of Eastern Michigan, but was released during training camp.

Cincinnati Bengals
After his release from the Giants, Walter signed with the Cincinnati Bengals. Walter spent three years mainly as a backup and special teams player, although he did see action in almost every game of his Bengals career and was actually a starter for a couple of games in 2005.

Houston Texans
The Houston Texans signed Walter to a restricted free agent tender in 2006, which the Bengals did not match. In return, the Texans gave up a seventh-round pick to the Bengals. After an injury to Pro-bowler Andre Johnson, Walter became the Texans number one receiver and after 8 games in 2007, Walter had 40 catches for 512 yards while also posting a career-high game at Jacksonville in week 6 with 12 catches for 160 yards. Walter's best season came in 2008, he had 60 receptions for 899 yards and 8 touchdowns. He was released by the Texans on March 12, 2013.

Tennessee Titans
On April 1, 2013 Walter signed with the Tennessee Titans. On August 27, 2013, the Titans placed Walter on the reserve/physically unable to perform list.

Personal life
He is married to college girlfriend Caroline, with whom he has one daughter and two sons.

References

External links
Houston Texans bio

1981 births
Living people
Sportspeople from Lake Forest, Illinois
Players of American football from Illinois
American football wide receivers
Eastern Michigan Eagles football players
New York Giants players
Cincinnati Bengals players
Houston Texans players
Tennessee Titans players
People from Vernon Hills, Illinois